Michel Alexandre (born 20 June 1946) is a French sailor who competed in the 1968 Summer Olympics.

References

1946 births
Living people
French male sailors (sport)
Olympic sailors of France
Sailors at the 1968 Summer Olympics – Dragon
Place of birth missing (living people)
20th-century French people